Luis Oswaldo Gómez Cáceres (born 20 April 1972 in Guayaquil), nicknamed "El Chino" (the Chinese) is a retired Ecuadorian footballer.

Club career
He played mostly for Barcelona Guayaquil, Deportivo Quito and for LDU Quito. In Argentina, he played in Ferro Carril Oeste.

International career
He played for the Ecuador national football team and was a participant at the 2002 FIFA World Cup.

References

1972 births
Living people
Sportspeople from Guayaquil
Ecuadorian footballers
Barcelona S.C. footballers
S.D. Quito footballers
Ferro Carril Oeste footballers
L.D.U. Quito footballers
C.D. Universidad Católica del Ecuador footballers
Ecuador international footballers
2002 FIFA World Cup players
2002 CONCACAF Gold Cup players
Ecuadorian expatriate footballers
Expatriate footballers in Argentina
Association football midfielders